Karl M. Kjer (born November 19, 1959) is an American entomologist, taxonomist, and molecular biologist.

Background
In 1992, Kjer received his Ph.D. in entomology at the University of Minnesota. During his post-doctorate at BYU, he studied homology on ribosomal RNA. He started teaching at Rutgers University in 1996.  In 2015, he accepted an endowed Chair in Insect Systematics at University of California, Davis, but resigned in 2016 citing "health and family reasons." In 2017, Kjer was convicted of one count of invasion of privacy after secretly recording a 19-year-old woman while she showered in his home.

Research
Kjer studies Trichoptera phylogeny, and is contributor to the Trichoptera Barcode of Life Database. The database is part of the Consortium for the Barcode of Life, a project which hopes to collect barcodes for all of life. The database had 61,000 individuals in 5,800 species as of 2015, representing about half the genetic diversity of Trichoptera. He showed that substitution rates are the most important factor in site-specific rate estimation, and that codon partitioning is a poor method of differential weighting. Kjer, along with Bernhard Misof and Xin Zhou, lead the 1KITE initiative, which studies insect evolution through both phylogenomic sequencing and morphology.

References 

1959 births
Living people
University of Minnesota College of Food, Agricultural and Natural Resource Sciences alumni
American taxonomists
American entomologists
Brigham Young University alumni
Rutgers University faculty
University of California, Davis faculty